Dogondoutchi Airport  is an airport serving Dogondoutchi, Niger.

See also

Transport in Niger
List of airports in Niger

References

External links
 OurAirports - Niger
  Great Circle Mapper - Dogondoutchi
 Dogondoutchi Airport
 Google Earth

Airports in Niger